Hot Pink is the debut studio album by the American band The Pink Spiders, released in 2005.

Track listing

Graphic design
The CD casing is designed to look like it's a vinyl record, reminding the listener to replace the needle, and breaking the track listing into sides. The design of the CD is even reminiscent of a vinyl single, for it is labeled as 33 RPM, and has the lines of the tracks on the design. It also has the "Modern Swinger" music video on it.

References

2005 albums
The Pink Spiders albums